Tanakia somjinensis is a species of ray-finned fish in the genus Tanakia.

References

Tanakia
Taxa named by Ik-Soo Kim
Taxa named by Chi-Hong Kim
Fish described in 1991